Legal Tender is a 1991 American erotic thriller film directed by Jag Mundhra and starring Tanya Roberts, Robert Davi, and Morton Downey Jr.

Plot
A beautiful bar owner (Tanya Roberts) has got in serious trouble as her secret job as an illegal poker dealer went wrong and led her to conflict with an influential but corrupted businessman (Morton Downey Jr.). An ex-cop turned private eye decides to help her out.

Cast
Tanya Roberts as Rikki Rennick
Robert Davi as Fix Cleary
Morton Downey Jr. as Mal Connery
Carlos Palomino as Detective Hernandez
Michael Greene as Ed Thorpe
Charles McCaughan as Bud Rennick
Maria Rangel as Lorrie De Luca
Wendy McDonald	as Verna
Robert Dean as Bobby Westcott
Donald Nardini	as Tony
Craig Stepp as Phil Trask
Pete Kochas Rudy Dushak
Daryl Roach as Willy

References

External links
 
 
 
 

1991 films
American erotic thriller films
Films directed by Jag Mundhra
1990s English-language films
1990s American films